Bigg Boss 14, also known as Bigg Boss: "Ab Scene Paltega", was the fourteenth season of the Indian reality TV series Bigg Boss. It premiered on 3 October 2020 on Colors TV. Salman Khan hosted the season for the eleventh time. The Grand Finale of the show took place on 21 February, 2021 where Rubina Dilaik emerged as the winner and Rahul Vaidya emerged as the 1st runner-up. 

Apart from the usual hour-long episode, viewers also had access to the direct 24x7 camera footage. The
viewers also had access to Before TV on Voot Select where episode was telecast 15 minutes before it was telecast on Colors TV. It also got extension of few weeks like season 13 and  became the longest season in the history of Bigg Boss making Rubina Dilaik the longest staying contestant in Bigg Boss House.

Production

Teaser
The season was delayed for a month due to heavy rain in Mumbai. On 8 August 2020, the makers released the first promo of the season on Colors TV. Due to the COVID-19 pandemic, the promos were shot at Salman Khan's farmhouse. After eight days, a second promo was released on Colors TV. The third promo was released on 29 August 2020. The fourth promo was released on 13 September 2020 revealing the date of 'Grand Premiere'. The 'Grand Finale' aired on 21 February 2021.

Eye logo
The border of the eye is dark yellow with a red background. Blue or purple electric lines come from the middle of the eye and join with yellow dots which are set on the inner side of the border which are made to appear like a wire. Each dot is connected with three lines that joined the big center iris of blue color with yellow bob.

House
The show this time had a "Futuristic Theme" and was located in Goregaon. The house had 2 special sections called BB Spa & BB Mall. On Day 17, Another house section was revealed called Red Zone where nominated housemates lived. On Day 37, the Red Zone was 
closed .

Housemates status

Housemates

Original entrants
The freshers in the order of appearance and entered in the house are:
 Eijaz Khan – Television and film actor. He is remembered for his role as Kkavya in Kkavyanjali, and was also seen in other shows including Kahiin to Hoga, Kyaa Hoga Nimmo Kaa, Yeh Moh Moh Ke Dhaagey and Punar Vivah - Ek Nayi Umeed.
 Nikki Tamboli – Film actress. She worked predominantly in Tamil and Telugu movie industries, which includes movies like Kanchana 3, Thipparaa Meesam and Chikati Gadilo Chithakotudu. 
 Abhinav Shukla – Model and actor. He was part of serials like Diya Aur Baati Hum, Geet – Hui Sabse Parayi and Silsila Badalte Rishton Ka.
 Rubina Dilaik – Television and film actress. She is known for playing Radhika Purohit in Chotti Bahu and Soumya Singh in Shakti - Astitva Ke Ehsaas Ki.
 Jasmin Bhasin – Television and film actress. She is known for her role as Twinkle Taneja Sarna in Tashan-e-Ishq and Teni Bhanushali in Dil Se Dil Tak, apart from being a contestant in Fear Factor: Khatron Ke Khiladi 9 and Fear Factor: Khatron Ke Khiladi - Made in India.
 Nishant Singh Malkani – Model and actor. He is known for his role of Anukalp Gandhi in Preet Se Bandhi Ye Dori Ram Milaayi Jodi and Akshat Jindal in Guddan Tumse Na Ho Payega and also acted in the films Horror Story (film) , Bezubaan Ishq.
 Shehzad Deol – Model. He was the third runner-up on the first season of MTV Ace of Space in 2018.
 Sara Gurpal – Singer and actress. She became popular after appearing in the song Jean sung by Ranjit Bawa and also acted in the films Manje Bistre and Dangar Doctor Jelly.
 Jaan Kumar Sanu – Musician/singer. He is the son of Bollywood singer Kumar Sanu.
 Pavitra Punia – Television actress. Known for her role as Geet in Love U Zindagi and as Nidhi in Yeh Hai Mohabbatein, she participated in  Splitsvilla 3 and appeared in several other serials like Kavach...Kaali Shaktiyon Se, Naagin 3, Daayan and Baalveer Returns.
 Rahul Vaidya – Singer. He was the second runner-up on the first season of Indian Idol, and winner of Jo Jeeta Wohi Superstar, a reality singing show on Star Plus.  He sung many songs in films like Shaadi No. 1, Jaan-E-Mann and Krazy 4.

Wild card entrants
Kavita Kaushik – Actress, television host and model. Kavita is known for Chandramukhi Chautala in F.I.R and for Dr.Bhanumati On Duty . 
Naina Singh – Television actress and model. Naina is the winner of Splitsvilla 10, runner up in India's Next Superstar and also known for portraying "Rhea" in Kumkum Bhagya.
Shardul Pandit – Television actor, radio jockey for Radio Mirch. Known as a radio jockey in Radio Mirchi. He appeared in the show Kuldeepak.
Aly Goni – Television actor. He is known for his role Romesh "Romi" Bhalla in Yeh Hai Mohabbatein.  He was a contestant in Fear Factor: Khatron Ke Khiladi 9 and  Fear Factor: Khatron Ke Khiladi Made in India.
Sonali Phogat – Politician, Actress and TikTok star. She has appeared in Punjabi and Haryanvi music videos.

Challengers 
 Vikas Gupta – Producer. Contestant of Season 11.
Rakhi Sawant – Actress and dancer. Contestant of Season 1.
Kashmera Shah – Former Bollywood actress and reality television star. Contestant of Season 1.
Rahul Mahajan – Political leader.  Contestant of Season 2 and Halla Bol.
Arshi Khan – Model, actress and dancer. Contestant of Season 11.
Manu Punjabi – Reality TV personality. Contestant of Season 10.

Guest entrants 
 Devoleena Bhattacharjee – Television actress. She was a contestant in Season 13. She appeared as a proxy for Eijaz Khan, who left the house due to prior commitments.

Twists
This season featured various twists, following are a few of the twists:

Seniors
The seniors in alphabetical order
The Seniors stayed in the house for 18 days:
 Gauahar Khan – Actress and model, winner of Season 7
 Hina Khan – Actress and model, runner up of Season 11
 Sidharth Shukla – Actor, model and host, winner of Season 13

Challengers
On Day 66, former Bigg Boss Contestants Rakhi, Arshi, Vikas, Manu, Rahul, and Kashmera entered the show as Challengers and became contenders for the Trophy.

Connection Week
In Week 19, Bigg Boss announced that the connections of the housemates will come in support of the contestants and spend a week with them in the Big Boss House. They entered on Day 129 and left on Day 134.

Housemate allotment

Notes 

 The Seniors were given the decision to select or reject the Fresher Housemates. They rejected four were confined to the garden area.
 The rejected Housemates were given a chance to change their status from Rejected to Selected and will be allowed to enter the House. Rubina didn't perform well in the task and stayed Rejected.
 *Rubina was allowed by Bigg Boss to change her status from Rejected to Selected, by sacrificing her chance to win immunity. She sacrificed and was allowed to stay in the house. *Nikki was selected as the first Confirmed Housemate by the Seniors.
 Shehzad was voted out by the Freshers and Seniors and received the status of Not Confirmed. 
 All Fresher housemates and Seniors competed in a task. Team Sidharth lost and therefore, Eijaz and Pavitra were evicted from the house. And Shehzad as the Not Confirmed housemate was also evicted. Everyone else was Confirmed.
 On Day 18, the Red Zone was revealed to the housemates. And Eijaz and Pavitra moved into the Red Zone.
 On Day 22, three Wild-Card Freshers entered the Green Zone.
 After the nominations, the four nominated housemates had to stay in the Red Zone. And as Eijaz was saved he moved to the Green Zone.
 During the first Tabadla, the four nominees got to choose any one housemate from the Green Zone to replace them in the Red Zone. Then Captain Eijaz had to decide either to swap or stay. He swapped all four housemates.
 After the Double Eviction process, Jasmin and Rubina moved back to Green Zone while Nishant and Kavita leave the Bigg Boss House.
 In the Nomination Task, the four housemates moved to the Red Zone and were nominated for eviction. On Day 33, Aly entered a Quarantined Zone and stayed there for a few days.

Weekly summary

Guest appearances

Through direct contact

Through Video Conferencing

Nominations table

Color Key
  Selected Housemates by Seniors (Week 1-2)
  Rejected Housemates by Seniors (Week 1-2)
  Team Gauhar (Week 3)
  Teadarkm Hina (Week 3)
  Team Sidharth (Week 3)
  No Team (Week 3)
  indicates that the Housemate was directly nominated for eviction.
  indicates that the Housemate was immune prior to nominations.
  indicates that the Housemate has been evicted.
  indicates that the Housemate has been evicted by Seniors or Housemates.
  indicates that the housemate has re entered.
  indicates the contestant walked out due to emergency.
  indicates the contestant has been ejected.
  indicates the house captain.

Nomination notes
 Kavita Kaushik walked out of the house following an argument between her and Rubina Dilaik.
 Rahul Vaidya quit the show on Day 64 after feeling homesick.
 Vikas Gupta was ejected from the show after he had pushed co–housemate Arshi Khan into the swimming pool.
 Vikas Gupta walks out of the house due to health issues.
 Manu Punjabi walks out of the house due to health issues.
 Eijaz Khan walks out of the house due to his prior commitments.
 Devoleena Bhattacharjee entered as Eijaz's replacement. Her eviction is counted as Eijaz's eviction.
 Rakhi Sawant walks out of the house after taking 14 Lakh rupees home.

References

External links
 Official website

14
2020 Indian television seasons
2021 Indian television seasons